The Pevsner Architectural Guides are a series of guide books to the architecture of Great Britain and Ireland. Begun in the 1940s by the art historian Sir Nikolaus Pevsner, the 46 volumes of the original Buildings of England series were published between 1951 and 1974. The series was then extended to Scotland, Wales and Ireland in the late 1970s. Most of the English volumes have had subsequent revised and expanded editions, chiefly by other authors.

The final Scottish volume, Lanarkshire and Renfrewshire, was published in autumn 2016. This completed the series' coverage of Great Britain, in the 65th anniversary year of its inception. The Irish series remains incomplete.

Origin and research methods
After moving to the United Kingdom from his native Germany as a refugee in the 1930s, Nikolaus Pevsner found that the study of architectural history had little status in academic circles, and that the amount of information available, especially to travellers wanting to inform themselves about the architecture of a particular district, was limited. He conceived a project to write a series of comprehensive county guides to rectify this, and gained the backing of Allen Lane, founder of Penguin Books, for whom he had written his Outline of European Architecture.

Work on the series began in 1945. Lane employed two part-time assistants, both German refugee art historians, who prepared notes for Pevsner from published sources. Pevsner spent the academic holidays touring the country to make personal observations and to carry out local research, before writing up the finished volumes. The first volume was published in 1951.

Pevsner wrote thirty-two of the books himself and ten with collaborators, with a further four of the original series written by others: the two Gloucestershire volumes by David Verey, and the two volumes on Kent by John Newman. Newman is the only author in the series to have written a volume and revised it three times.

Since Pevsner's death, work has continued on the series, with several volumes now in their third revision, and three in their fourth editions.

Buildings of England
The books are compact and intended to meet the needs of both specialists and the general reader. Each contains an extensive introduction to the architectural history and styles of the area, followed by a town-by-townand in the case of larger settlements, street-by-streetaccount of individual buildings. These are often grouped under the heading Perambulation, as Pevsner intended the books to be used as the reader was walking about the area. The guides offer both detailed coverage of the most notable buildings and notes on lesser-known and vernacular buildings; all building types are covered but there is a particular emphasis on churches and public buildings. Each volume has a central section with several dozen pages of photographs, originally in black and white, though colour illustrations have featured in revised volumes published by Yale University Press since 2003.

Boundaries
The boundaries of each volume do not follow a uniform pattern and have evolved with revisions and expansions. The original intention was to maintain whatever boundaries were current at the time of writing; in the first years of the survey these were the traditional counties of England. However, boundary changes to the London area in 1965 and the rest of England in 1974 meant that this was no longer practicable. As such there are now many variants: Cumbria, for example, covers the modern non-metropolitan countyexcepting the district of Sedbergh which although in modern Cumbria is included in the volume covering the West Riding of Yorkshire. Conversely, the Furness areageographically in Cumbria but traditionally in Lancashireis included, having been omitted from the predecessor volume, Cumberland and Westmorland.

The six volumes currently covering London collectively represent the 32 London boroughs plus the City, which constitute the modern Greater London region, rather than earlier divisions. The entire volume on Middlesex was an early casualty of this rearrangement, as are parts of the revised volumes covering Surrey, Essex and Kent. Birmingham and the Black Country covers the area bounded by the modern West Midlands metropolitan county, but minus the Metropolitan Borough of Coventry and the rural part of Metropolitan Borough of Solihull. These appear in the revised Warwickshire volume, despite no longer being in that county. Hence Warwickshire now follows the boundary of neither the traditional nor the modern county.

The Buildings of Scotland similarly features hybrid divisions, with volumes such as Fife and Lanarkshire and Renfrewshire reflecting their traditional county boundaries whilst Highland and Islands corresponds to the modern counterparts. The Buildings of Ireland has so far broadly corresponded to the traditional provinces of Ireland and is blind to the Border between the Republic of Ireland and Northern Ireland. The Buildings of Wales largely follows the post-1974 divisions.

Volumes in print and their editions
The list below is of the volumes that are currently in print.

Since 1962, the guides have undergone a gradual programme of updating to reflect architectural-history scholarship and to include significant new buildings. Pevsner left virtually all the revisions to others, acting as supervisor only. He ultimately revised only two of his original editions alone: London 1: The Cities of London and Westminster (1962) and Cambridgeshire (1970). Both were later revised again by others. To date, the oldest wholly unrevised volume is Yorkshire: The North Riding (1966). Staffordshire (1974) is the only other volume currently issued in its unrevised first edition.

Until 1953, all volumes were published in paperback only, after which both hardback and paperback versions were issued. The revision of London: 1 in 1962 was the first volume to be issued in hardback alone, and no further paperbacks were issued after 1964. Until 1970 volumes bore a sequential BE reference number, with Cornwall being BE1. The last volume to be so numbered was Gloucestershire 2: The Vale and the Forest of Dean (BE41). Thereafter ISBNs identify each volume. Beginning in 1983, a larger format was introduced, and all subsequent new editions have been issued in this format. Volumes revised pre-1983 have been reprinted in the original, smaller format (marked with an asterisk in the table below). All editions are now published by Yale University Press.

Where revisions have been spread over more than one volume, the preceding edition remains in print until the whole area has been revised.

Notes

City Guides
The first of the paperback City Guides, covering Manchester, appeared in 2001. It featured a new format with integrated colour illustrations. In most cases the City Guides have preceded a revision of the county volume in which they are located, although they do go into greater detail than the county volumes and have more illustrations. Thus the Birmingham guide completely supersedes the central Birmingham section of the Warwickshire volume, which is now almost fifty years old. Two of the guides, covering Newcastle and Gateshead and Hull, are more recent than the hardback editions for the surrounding counties, and therefore update as well as expand the coverage of those cities. This series appears to be on a hiatus, with no new volumes published since 2010 and none confirmed as in planning.

Two supplementary worksthus far the only of their typewere published in 1998, one covering London's City Churches and the other the Docklands area (see London Docklands in Superseded and unpublished volumes below). Both were issued in the format of the main series rather than the City Guides. However, unlike the Docklands edition which represented preliminary work for an expanded main volume, the City Churches volume augmented the text in London 1: The City, published the previous year. The continued development of the Docklands area meant that the volume was superseded when London 5: East was published seven years later, but the City Churches volume remains current and was reissued by Yale in 2002.

London City Churches (1998) (Simon Bradley)

Buildings of Scotland
The series continued under Pevsner's founding editorship into Scotland. The format is largely similar; however, only Lothian was published in the original small volume style. One noticeable difference in some of the Scottish series is a greater subdivision of the main gazetteer (e.g. in Argyll and Bute mainland Argyll has separate gazetteer from its islands, and Bute similarly is treated on its own). Unlike The Buildings of England, none of the Scottish volumes adopts a hierarchy of ecclesiastical buildings, instead grouping them together. As with the English revisions, several of the volumes are the work of many contributors. The series was completed with Lanarkshire and Renfrewshire, published in November 2016. A new edition of Lothian is in preparation, set to be published in 2022.

The volumes on Glasgow and Edinburgh are, with Dublin (see below) the only Pevsner volumes outside London to focus exclusively on a city. These volumes should not be confused with the City Guide format (see above).

Buildings of Wales
The series has also been extended to Wales, and was completed with the issue of Gwynedd in 2009 (although this initial survey had taken seven years longer than Pevsner's first complete survey of England). Only the first volume, Powys (edited by Richard Haslam, and published in 1979), appeared in the original small format style; and this volume has now been superseded by a revised large-format edition, published in 2013. This is the first (and to date only) guide outside The Buildings of England series to be revised.

Buildings of Ireland
The Irish series is incomplete, with six volumes being published between 1979 and 2020. Research for some of the remaining five volumes is underway.

Crown dependencies
Pevsner did not make any moves to extend the series to the Isle of Man or Channel Islands. However, a volume covering the Isle of Man is to be published in early 2023.

 Isle of Man (2023)  (Jonathan Kewley)

Treatment of bridges
A number of bridges connect areas covered by different volumes. However, there is no single approach for which volume should include the structure in its main gazetteer. In some cases, one volume refers the reader to the other, and in other cases only a few lines appear in one volume and a fuller entry appears in the other. In a very few cases (listed below) a full entry appears in both volumes.

Superseded and unpublished volumes
The revision of the series has rendered some original volumes obsolete, usually as the area of coverage has changed. For example, the county of Cumbria was created after the publication of Cumberland and Westmorland and North Lancashire, leading to the merger of material from both volumes in a single volume Cumbria, a revision with a new geographical focus.
To date the following volumes have been entirely superseded:

Cumberland and Westmorland (1967)
London: the Cities of London and Westminster (1957, rev. 1962 and 1973)
London, except the Cities of London and Westminster (1952)
London Docklands (1998) (with Elizabeth Williamson)
Middlesex (1951)
North Lancashire (1969)
South Lancashire (1969)
Suffolk (1961, rev. Enid Radcliffe 1974)
Yorkshire: The West Riding (1959, rev. Enid Radcliffe 1967)

In addition, two volumes, North Devon and South Devon (1952) were superseded by a single volume covering the entire county. Parts of the original Hampshire & the Isle of Wight and Yorkshire: the West Riding volumes have been superseded by revised volumes.

In some published volumes and in advance publicity, certain titles were announced which were ultimately never published. A number of factors accounted for this, including the readiness of parts of the text covering certain areas and the anticipated size of the volumes. Unpublished titles included:

Argyll, Bute and Stirling
Ayrshire, Lanarkshire and Renfrewshire
Dublin: City and County
London III 
South Strathclyde

Related works
In 1995 Penguin, in conjunction with English Heritage, released a publication based on the guides entitled Looking at Buildings. Focusing on the East Riding of Yorkshire volume, Pevsner's text was adapted as an introduction, with a greater number of illustrations than the main guides. No further print publications were issued, but the title survives as an introductory website to architectural terms and selected buildings which feature in the Pevsner guides.

In 1995 a CD-ROM entitled A Compendium of Pevsner's Buildings of England was issued by Oxford University Press, designed as a searchable database of the volumes published for England only. A second edition was released in 2005. Bibliographies of the guides themselves were published in 1983, 1998 and 2012 by the Penguin Collectors Society.

In 2016, Yale University Press published three volumes, each serving as an introduction to some of the buildings and the architectural terms mentioned in the text of the guides. Published as Pevsner Architectural Guides: Introductions these are: an architectural glossary (also available as an app), a volume focusing on church buildings and another on dwelling houses (including vernacular architecture).

Celebratory volumes
In 1986, Penguin published an anthology from Pevsner's volumes edited by Bridget Cherry and John Newman, The Best Buildings of England, . It has an introduction by Newman assessing Pevsner's aims and methods. In 2001, the Penguin Collectors Society published The Buildings of England: a Celebration, edited by Simon Bradley and Bridget Cherry, fifty years after BE1 was published: it includes twelve essays and a selection of text from the series. In 2012, Susie Harries, one of Pevsner's biographers, wrote The Buildings of England, Ireland, Scotland and Wales: A Sixtieth Anniversary Catalogue of the Pevsner Architectural Guides, which was published in a limited edition of 1,000 copies by the Penguin Collectors Society.

Travels with Pevsner
In 1997, the BBC broadcast a series of documentaries entitled Travels with Pevsner, in which six writers and broadcasters travelled through a county which had particular significance to them. They revisited buildings mentioned by Pevsner, critically examining his views on them. A further series was broadcast in 1998. John Grundy, who presented the programme on Northumberland, was one of the revisers of that county volume. Both series were accompanied by booklets published by the BBC, describing the buildings featured in the programmes and suggesting others to explore. The counties visited and the travellers were:

Series One

Norfolk (Dan Cruikshank)
North Yorkshire (Janet Street-Porter)
Dorset (Patrick Wright)
County Durham (Lucinda Lambton)
Warwickshire (Germaine Greer)
Surrey (Michael Bracewell)

Series Two

Derbyshire (Joan Bakewell)
Hampshire and the Isle of Wight (Philip Hoare)
Worcestershire (Jonathan Meades)
Suffolk (Craig Brown)
Northumberland (John Grundy)
Bristol and Somerset (Philippa Gregory)

In both series, extracts from Pevsner's text were read by Benjamin Whitrow.

See also
 Survey of Londonan even more detailed but incomplete account of the architecture of London
 The Penguin Collectors Society for the Pevsner Memorial Trust
 The King's England
 Victoria County History
 Buildings of the United Statesa series inspired by the Buildings of England

References

Sources

External links
Pevsner Architectural Guides, Yale University Press
Looking at Buildings website

Architecture books
Architecture in the United Kingdom
Architectural history
Series of non-fiction books
1940s establishments in the United Kingdom
Publications established in the 1940s